Château-Rouge (Lorraine Franconian: Roudendroff) is a commune in the Moselle department in Grand Est in north-eastern France.

Previous names: Château Rouge ou Rothdorf (1793), Rothdorff (1794-1795), Châteaurouge (1801).

See also
 Communes of the Moselle department

References

External links
 

Chateaurouge